The following is a list of notable people from or related to Ballia district, India

Activism, social work, and philanthropy 

Bhrigu – Brahmin saint from Ballia district
Chittu Pandey – activist of 1942 Quit India Movement
Mangal Pandey – prominent soldier in the 1857 revolution of India
Jagadish Shukla - US scientist
Raja Mohar Singh – Raja of Maurha from 1894 until 1923
Rabindra Nath Upadhyay – social worker

Art and literature 

Amarkant – writer of Hindi literature
Bulaki Das - Saint and Bhojpuri poet
Hazari Prasad Dwivedi – novelist and literary historian
Suryakumar Pandey – poet and writer
Doodhnath Singh – Hindi language writer, critic and poet
Kedarnath Singh – poet, critic, and essayist
Baldev Upadhyaya – Sanskrit scholar, literary historian and essayist

Film, television and entertainment 

Siddhant Chaturvedi - Bollywood film actor

Politics and government 

Ram Govind Chaudhary - politician of the Samajwadi Party, ex-Leader of Opposition.
Murli Manohar – politician from Uttar Pradesh state, member of parliament in 1962 for the Ballia Lok Sabha constituency from the Indian National Congress
Virendra Singh Mast - Bharatiya Janata Party - Member of Parliament, 17th Lok Sabha, Ballia (Lok Sabha constituency)
Janeshwar Mishra – Ex MP Rajyasabha, Ex Rail Minister
Jayaprakash Narayan – Independence activist and political leader
Bacha Pathak - Indian National Congress - Member of Legislative Assembly. ( Constituency - Bansdih, Ballia), Two time Cabinet Minister in Uttar Pradesh Government.
Chandra Shekhar – 8th Prime Minister of India
Neeraj Shekhar - Bharatiya Janata Party - Member of Parliament,  Rajya Sabha, Uttar Pradesh (Rajya Sabha)
Daya Shankar Singh - Minister of Transport, Government of Uttar Pradesh in the Second Yogi Adityanath ministry
Harivansh Narayan Singh – Deputy Chairman of the Rajya Sabha (2018) 
Manager Singh - political leader elected five times as the MLA from Doaba constituency.
Umashankar Singh - BSP Rasara constituency
Upendra Tiwari - BJP Phephana constituency

References

 
B
B